L'hippopotamours is a 1976 French film. The plot follows three women who escape from a psychiatric facility and cause mayhem.

References

1976 films
1970s French-language films